Government College of Engineering, Aurangabad (GECA) is an autonomous engineering Institute in Maharashtra state of India. It is affiliated to the Dr. Babasaheb Ambedkar Marathwada University and was established in 1960. The construction of the college was started in 1957 and was completed in 1960. Later on, it included the extension building that presently houses the Electronics and Telecommunication Department, Computer Science Engineering Department & Master of Computer Application Department. The recently constructed classroom complex houses the classes of first year students of all branches along with Information Technology Department.

Departments

Civil engineering 

Civil Engineering is traditional branch of engineering and is amongst the founding courses when the institution was started. The department is located in the 'Annexe' building of the college. The Department of Civil Engineering conducts both full time and part time undergraduate courses in Civil engineering. It also conducts postgraduate programme in Water Resources Engineering, Structural Engineering, and a part time Post-Graduate programme in Soil Engineering.

Electronics and telecommunication engineering 
Department of E&TC had started U.G. Course B.E.(E&TC) in 1986 with sanctioned intake of 40 and enhanced to 60 in 1996. Department also runs full time Post Graduate Course M.E. (EC) and well equipped Recognized Research centre leading to Ph.D. (Electronics Engineering). Part time BE (E&TC) and part time ME (EC) are also run to give opportunity to working graduates and diploma holders.

Computer Science and engineering 
Department of CSE had started U.G. Course B.E.(CSE) in 1986 with sanctioned intake of 40 and enhanced to 60 in 1996. Department also runs full time Post Graduate Course M.E. (CSE) and well equipped Recognized Research centre leading to Ph.D. (Computer Science and Engineering). Part time BE (CSE) and part time ME (CSE) are also run to give opportunity to working graduates and diploma holders. NAGAMAS69

Student life

Team Cybrotics (Robotics Club Of  GECA) 
Team Cybrotics, of Government College of Engineering, Aurangabad, is a group of robotics enthusiasts who have been fabricating robots since 2010.  participating in ABU- Robocon, an International Robotic Contest for last 9 years. The National level competition (Robocon India) of ABU Robocon is being organised by Doordarshan and the winner of this national level competition gets the chance to represent India at International level.

Team Techrovers 
Team Techrovers , of Government College of Engineering , Aurangabad, The Team Techrovers is a team of young innovators working in the field of Robotics and Automation since 2019. This journey is full of Awards Winning Innovations and Discoveries. Our team had worked many UAVs, Open Source Robots, EVs, and Combat Robotics ,followed with lots of Prizes and Awards including a State and A national Level Prize. All members in the team are the Students of one of the most reputed Engineering College in Marathwada Region. The Government College of Engineering, Aurangabad.

See also 
Other Government Engineering Colleges (GEC's) in Maharashtra

 College of Engineering, Pune
 Government College of Engineering, Amravati
 Government College of Engineering, Chandrapur
 Government College of Engineering, Karad
 Shri Guru Gobind Singhji Institute of Engineering and Technology, Nanded
 Veermata Jijabai Technological Institute, Mumbai
 Government College Of Engineering And Research, Avasari Khurd

References

Engineering colleges in Maharashtra
Education in Aurangabad, Maharashtra
Educational institutions established in 1960
1960 establishments in Maharashtra